Clearco is a lending firm led by Andrew Curtis that specializes in non-dilutive revenue-share agreements with start-ups. Clearbanc claims to make equity-free investments in businesses within 48 hours based on information provided on the two metrics ad spend and unit economics and calls this ‘The 20-Min Term Sheet’.

It is a Canadian business founded in 2015, headquartered in Toronto. It partly uses Artificial Intelligence to make decisions on potential investments. As of August 2019, it invested in 791 businesses, has a stated monthly average revenue of $121 million and raised $1 billion.

In 2021, Clearbanc rebranded itself Clearco in order to reflect the goal of long-term partnerships with clients based not only on financing.

Unlike venture capital firms that require stock, Clearco takes a fee on investments up to $10 million. Businesses apply online, and its payback fees range from 6–12.5%.

Business Model 

Clearco offers capital from $10,000 up to $10 million to entrepreneurs. The platform uses an AI system to connect to a potential client's payment, ad and e-commerce platforms to analyze their business' financial health and revenue. The platform then reviews the data and automates the diligence process, effectuating funding decisions within minutes. By only reviewing financial and marketing data, Clearco posits it is "able to remove the bias out of traditional VC funding", translating into more capital being extended to female founders "on their platform over the industry average".

References

Venture capital firms of Canada
2015 establishments in Canada
Companies based in Toronto